The Corsica River is a tidal river in Queen Anne's County in the U.S. state of Maryland. The river begins near Centreville and empties into the Chester River.

Variant names
The United States Geological Survey records the following variant names for the Corsica River:

Corsaca Creek
Corseca Creek
Corsica Creek
Coursaca Creeke
Coursegall Creek
Coursevall Creek
Coursivall Creek
Coursys Creek
Croseor Creeke
Muddy Branch

See also
List of Maryland rivers
Red Kayak

References

External links
NOAA nautical chart 12272

Tributaries of the Chesapeake Bay
Rivers of Queen Anne's County, Maryland
Rivers of Maryland